Wetzig is a German surname. Notable people with the surname include:

Roland Wetzig (born 1959), East German bobsledder
Ute Wetzig (born 1971), German diver

German-language surnames
Surnames from given names